Alan David Butler (23 October 1927 – July 1972) was a Rhodesian sailor, businessman and politician. He competed at the 1960 and 1964 Summer Olympics in the Flying Dutchman event and finished in fourth and eleventh place, respectively.

Family 
Butler was born in London to Lois Butler and Alan Samuel Butler. His mother competed in Alpine skiing at the 1936 Winter Olympics for Canada, and flew as a pilot for the Air Transport Auxiliary during the Second World War. His father was the chairman of the de Havilland Aircraft Company. 

In 1951 Butler married Joanna; they had two sons, Nigel and Rhett. Joanna died of cancer in October 1970.

In July 1971 Butler married Jill Ord.

Education 
Butler studied at Eton College in England, and also spent some of his junior years in Canada.

Business and politics 
In 1949 his family moved to Southern Rhodesia (present day Zimbabwe), where Butler became a farmer in Matabeleland and built a business empire, which included a charter aircraft company.

Sports 
In the late 1940s he was a candidate for the British Alpine skiing Olympic team, but broke his ankles and ended his skiing career.

In the 1950s he entered politics as a member of the Rhodesian parliament, and by the 1965 election was a leader of the United Federal Party. His party lost that election to Rhodesian Front, a party that promoted the policy of white rule in the country. This resulted in the suspension of Rhodesia from the Olympic movement, closing any prospects for the 1968 Olympics for Butler.

Death 
Butler was preparing for the 1972 Games in Europe, but was killed in a road accident in Belgium. His ashes were scattered from his own crop-spraying aircraft over his cattle ranch at Balla Balla. Butler's wife Ord was seriously injured in the accident that killed Butler.

References

External links
 
 
 

1927 births
1972 deaths
Members of the Legislative Assembly of Southern Rhodesia
People educated at Eton College
Sportspeople from London
English people of Canadian descent
White Rhodesian people
British emigrants to Rhodesia
Olympic sailors of Rhodesia
Rhodesian male sailors (sport)
Sailors at the 1960 Summer Olympics – Flying Dutchman
Sailors at the 1964 Summer Olympics – Flying Dutchman
Rhodesian businesspeople
Rhodesian politicians
Road incident deaths in Belgium
Rhodesian company founders
United Federal Party politicians